Metacrateria is a genus of snout moths described by George Hampson in 1918.

Species
Metacrateria perirrorella Hampson, 1918
Metacrateria pulverulella (Hampson, 1896)

References

Phycitinae